Spencer George Jones (born May 14, 2001) is an American professional baseball outfielder in the New York Yankees organization.

Amateur career
Jones attended La Costa Canyon High School in Carlsbad, California. As a junior in 2018, he had a 4.09 earned run average (ERA) with 33 walks and 33 strikeouts over  innings pitched and had a .414 batting average with five home runs. He played in the Perfect Game All-American Classic and the Under Armour All-America Baseball Game that summer. He fractured his elbow as a senior in 2019 while pitching and missed the remainder of the season. He was still selected by the Los Angeles Angels in the 31st round of the 2019 Major League Baseball draft but did not sign and instead enrolled at Vanderbilt University to play college baseball.

Jones enrolled at Vanderbilt as a two-way player, and appeared in 14 games before the season was cancelled due to the COVID-19 pandemic. After the season, he began playing collegiate summer baseball with the Santa Barbara Foresters of the California Collegiate League. Midway through the summer, he injured his elbow once again and underwent Tommy John surgery. During his 2021 season at Vanderbilt, he was unable to pitch due to the surgery, but still appeared in 34 games as a designated hitter, batting .274 with three home runs and ten RBIs. That summer, he played in the Cape Cod Baseball League with the Brewster Whitecaps where he batted .309 with two home runs and twenty RBIs over 29 games. Jones returned fully healthy in 2022 and became Vanderbilt's starting right fielder, choosing to stop pitching. During a game on May 10, versus Indiana State University, Jones went 6-for-6 with a walk-off single in the 11th inning, tying the school record for most hits in a single game. He finished the season having played in 61 games with a .370/.460/.644 slash line with 12 home runs, sixty RBIs, and 21 doubles, earning First Team All-SEC honors. Following the season's end, he traveled to San Diego where he participated in the Draft Combine.

Professional career
The New York Yankees selected Jones in the first round with the 25th overall selection of the 2022 Major League Baseball draft. He signed with the team for $2.88 million. 

Jones made his professional debut with the Florida Complex League Yankees and was promoted to the Tampa Tarpons after three games. Over 25 games between both teams, he batted .344 with four home runs, 12 RBIs, and 12 stolen bases.

References

External links
Vanderbilt Commodores bio

2001 births
Living people
People from Encinitas, California
Baseball players from California
Baseball outfielders
Vanderbilt Commodores baseball players
Brewster Whitecaps players
Florida Complex League Yankees players
Tampa Tarpons players